Cavalry Ground  is a neighbourhood located within Walton Cantonment of Lahore, Punjab, Pakistan. Although part of Lahore City District, Cavalry Ground is governed directly by the Lahore Cantonment Board. Masood Anwari Road serves as the central commercial area of the neighbourhood.

History
In 1997, Jinnah Flyover was constructed to help ease the flow of traffic. In January 2011, Cavalry Ground entered into the national media spotlight over two major incidents. On 11 January 2011, the parents of Justice Javed Iqbal, a senior judge of the Supreme Court of Pakistan (Malik Abdul Hameed and Zarina) were found murdered under what police called "mysterious circumstances". Preliminary investigations suggested that both had suffocated to death in their bedroom. In a separate incident almost 10 days later, it was reported that between 21 January and 27 January 2011, Raymond Davis (a detained CIA contractor) had reportedly used the residence at 59/A Cavalry Ground.

References

External links
 Map of Cavalry Ground

Lahore Cantonment